Dahod is one of the 182 Legislative Assembly constituencies of Gujarat state in India. It is part of Dahod district and is reserved for candidates belonging to the Scheduled Tribes.

List of segments
This assembly seat represents the following segments,

 Dahod Taluka (Part) Villages – Dungra, Doki, Chosala, Kharoda, Chhayan, Bhathiwada, Sakarda, Kharod, Rentiya, Khodva, Jekot, Rampura, Borwani, Khajuri, Chhapri, Usarvan, Delsar, Rajpur, Kharedi, Ranapur Bujarg, Ranapur Khurd, Navagam, Ravali Kheda, Salapada, Zari Khurd, Tanda, Kotda Bujarg, Junapani, Tanachhiya, Bordi Khurd, Bordi Inami, Karamchandnu Khedun, Kotda Khurd, Dhamarda, Mandavav, Dungarpur, Ukardi, Kali Talai, Rozam, Muwalia, Rabdal, Nimnalia, Nasirpur, Punsri, Jalat, Vanbhori, Bhambhori, Tarvadia Himat, Khut Kheda, Gundi Kheda, Himala, Udar, Kheng, Rachharda, Timarda, Itawa, Tarvadiya Vaja, Tarvadiya Bhau, Gamla, Chandawada, Bandibar, Limdabara, Uchavaniya, RNA (Freelandgunj), Dohad (M)

Member of Legislative Assembly
2007 - Vajesingh Panada, Indian National Congress
2012 - Vajesingh Panada, Indian National Congress

Election candidate

2022

Election results

2017

2012

See also
 List of constituencies of the Gujarat Legislative Assembly
 Dahod district

References

External links
 

Assembly constituencies of Gujarat
Dahod district